Alan van Sprang (born June 19, 1971) is a Canadian actor best known for playing Sir Francis Bryan in the series The Tudors, appearing in the Living Dead films of George A. Romero and for playing King Henry on The CW's original series Reign. He also portrayed Valentine Morgenstern on Freeform's hit show, Shadowhunters.

Personal life

Van Sprang has a son named Logan.

Filmography

Film

Television

References

External links 

Alan Van Sprang on Instagram
Alan Van Sprang on Twitter

1971 births
Canadian male film actors
Canadian male television actors
Canadian male voice actors
Living people
Male actors from Calgary
Canadian people of Dutch descent